This is a List of Old Knox Grammarians, former students of the Uniting Church school, Knox Grammar School in Wahroonga, New South Wales, Australia.

Academic
Bruce Carter, educator, former Principal of Emanuel School, Sydney
 Vaughan Pratt, professor, MIT 1972–1981, Stanford 1981–2000, emeritus 2000–.
 Michael Spence (academic), 25th Vice-Chancellor and Principal of the University of Sydney 2008–.

Business
David S. Clarke, Macquarie Bank chairman

Media, entertainment and the arts

 Michael Barkl OAM composer
 Stuart Beattie screenwriter
 Ian Cooper, violinist 
 Bruce Elder, journalist
 Peter FitzSimons, Columnist for the Sydney Morning Herald and Sun Herald, author, former Wallabies player
 Adam Garcia, actor and dancer
 John Howard, film and television actor
 Hugh Jackman, actor, and former school captain of Knox in 1986
 Richard Lane, radio personality and writer
 John Laws, radio presenter
 Reg Livermore, actor and entertainer
 Peter Mochrie, actor
 Richard Neville, former editor of the satirical Oz magazine
 Jordan Rodrigues, actor
 Mark Scott, Managing Director, ABC
 Rai Thistlethwayte, singer-songwriter 
 Steve Toltz, Man Booker Prize shortlisted author of A Fraction of the Whole
 Hugo Weaving, actor
 Gus Worland, radio and television host
 Peter Yeldham screenwriter, playwright and author

Politics, public service and the law
 Paul Brereton AM RFD, Justice of the NSW Supreme Court and Court of Appeal, Major General 
Sir John Fuller, former New South Wales MP, Leader of the Opposition from 1976–1978.
 Hon Sir Kenneth Jacobs, former Justice of the High Court of Australia
 Hon Nick Minchin, former Federal cabinet minister; leader of Opposition in the Senate
 Brian Preston, Chief Justice of the New South Wales Land and Environment Court
 Rt Hon Ian Sinclair, former Federal cabinet minister and Speaker of the House
 Hon Gough Whitlam, former Prime Minister of Australia (also attended Mowbray House School, Telopea Park High School and Canberra Grammar School)
 James Roland Wood, former judge

Sport
 Ben Alexander, ACT Brumbies representative and Australian Wallabies rugby player
 Braeden Campbell- AFL Player
 Tom Carter, NSW Waratahs representative
Cameron Clark, Olympian representing Australia national rugby sevens team and NSW Waratahs representative
 Steve Cutler, Australian Wallabies rugby player
 Matthew Dunn, Olympic swimmer and gold medallist in Pan Pacific and Commonwealth Games
 Chris Green, New South Wales cricket team representative and Sydney Thunder representative and 2015–16 Big Bash League season Grand Final winner
 Alan Gurr Australian V8 Supercar driver
 Max Purcell Australian tennis player
 Lachlan Mitchell, London Wasps player
 Matthew Nicholson, state cricketer who played one test for Australia
 Evan Olmstead Canadian international rugby player, representative of Newcastle Falcons, Auckland Rugby and Birritz Olympique
 Rex Pemberton, youngest Australian to climb Mount Everest, at 21
 Nic Stirzaker, Melbourne Rebels representative and captain 
 Bruce Taafe, Australian Wallabies rugby player, NSW Waratah Exec VP Wall St IT corporations
 Ross Turnbull, Australian Wallabies rugby player, coach of NSW and for a short time the Wallabies head coach. The head of ARU board for several years
 Connor Watson, Australian National Rugby League player for the Newcastle Knights, formerly played for the Sydney Roosters 
 Simon Whitfield, gold medallist at 2000 Olympics Men's Triathlon held in Sydney
 Sam Kitchen, Edinburgh Rugby Player
 Lachlan Swinton, NSW Waratahs Player, Australian Wallabies representative 
 Nicholas Frost, ACT Brumbies player
 Luke Parks, AFL footballer
 Troy Dargan, NRL Player and Cook Islands representative
 Bailey Simonsson, NRL Player (also attended Newington College)

See also
List of non-government schools in New South Wales
List of boarding schools
Combined Associated Schools

References

External links
 Knox Grammar School website

Lists of people educated in New South Wales by school affiliation
Knoz Grammar
 
Sydney-related lists
Lists of Australian men